Deer Lake Regional Airport  is located  north northeast of Deer Lake, Newfoundland and Labrador, Canada. It is currently run by the Deer Lake Regional Airport Authority and is the closest airport to Gros Morne National Park and Corner Brook. It is the second busiest airport on Newfoundland after St. John's International Airport serving 300,000 passengers annually. Deer Lake Airport serves a large area of Newfoundland, from the Great Northern Peninsula to Channel-Port aux Basques.

History 

Deer Lake Airport dates back to 1953. Construction began in 1953 and by the autumn of 1955 a  gravel strip was in operation. Eastern Provincial Airways began jet service using Boeing 737-200 aircraft in July 1969. Construction of a new terminal started in 1990 and was completed the following year. Deer Lake Regional Airport's  runway is capable of handling daily service of Beechcraft 1900, Bombardier Dash 8, Bombardier CRJ200, Airbus A319, Airbus A321, and Boeing 737 Next Generation aircraft.

In 2020, as a result of the COVID-19 pandemic, the airport suffered notable cuts to its airline routes.

Facilities 
The terminal is equipped with a restaurant, gift shop and other amenities. A large long-term parking lot is located on-site.

The airport is equipped with seven aircraft gates which are able to stand aircraft from the Beech 1900 to the Airbus widebody aircraft. Throughout the year the airport is equipped with deicing facilities.

Airlines and destinations

Passenger

Fixed-base operators (FBOs), ground handling services 
Nalair
Allied Aviation
Menzies Aviation
 Woodward Aviation (Woodward’s Oil Limited)

References

External links

 Official website
 Page about this airport  on COPA's Places to Fly airport directory

Certified airports in Newfoundland and Labrador